Gartner's duct, also known as Gartner's canal or the ductus longitudinalis epoophori, is a potential embryological remnant in human female development of the mesonephric duct in the development of the urinary and reproductive organs. It was discovered and described in 1822 by Hermann Treschow Gartner.

Gartner's duct is located in the uterus' broad ligament. Its position is parallel with the lateral uterine tube and lateral walls of vagina and cervix.

The paired mesonephric ducts in the male, in contrast, go on to form the paired epididymis, ductus deferens, ejaculatory duct and seminal vesicle.

In females, they may persist between the layer of the broad ligament of the uterus and in the wall of the vagina.

Clinical significance
These may give rise to Gartner's duct cysts.

See also
List of homologues of the human reproductive system

References

External links
 
 

Mammal female reproductive system